The following is a list of Strictly Come Dancing contestants to date along with their age at the time of competing, professional partners, competition finish, number of dances, highest and lowest scores, total scores and average scores. This does not include results from any of the Christmas specials or other special editions held for Children in Need or Sport Relief.

The scores and their averages do not include any additional guest judges (such as Donny Osmond in series 12) or from any dances that were not scored on the same scale, such as the Swing-a-thon. For Week 5 of Series 15 and all of Series 18, there were only three judges, and the scores were out of 30; these scores have been weighted to work on the same scale.

List of contestants

Key:
 Winners of the series
 Runners-up of the series
 Third place of the series
 Last place of the series
 Withdrew
 Participating in the current series

Gallery

Footnotes

Strictly Come Dancing
Contestants
Strictly Come Dancing contestants